Ogoa is a genus of moths in the subfamily Lymantriinae erected by Francis Walker in 1856. The species are known from Africa.

Ogoa fuscovenata Wichgraf, 1922 (Tanzania)
Ogoa lutea (Grünberg, 1907) (eastern Africa)
Ogoa luteola (Hering, 1926) (Congo)
Ogoa melanocera (Mabille, 1879)  (Madagascar)
Ogoa neavei Rothschild, 1916 (Malawi)
Ogoa oberthueri Rothschild, 1916 (Comoros, Madagascar)
Ogoa simplex Walker, 1856 (Kenya, South Africa, Tanzania)
Ogoa turbida (Hering, 1928) (Kenya)
Ogoa vitrina (Mabille, 1879) (Madagascar)

References

Lymantriinae